Shewa, formerly romanized as Shua, Shoa, Showa, Shuwa (Scioà in Italian), is a historical region of Ethiopia which was formerly an autonomous kingdom within the Ethiopian Empire. The modern Ethiopian capital Addis Ababa is located at its center. Modern Shewa includes the historical Endagabatan province.

The towns of Debre Berhan, Antsokia, Ankober, Entoto and, after Shewa became a province of Ethiopia, Addis Ababa have all served as the capital of Shewa at various times. Most of northern Shewa, made up of the districts of Menz, Tegulet,  Yifat, Menjar and Bulga, is populated by Christian Amharas, while southern Shewa is inhabited by the Gurages and eastern Shewa has large Oromo and Argobba Muslim populations. The monastery of Debre Libanos, founded by Saint Tekle Haymanot, is located in the district of Selale, also known as Grarya, a former province of Abyssinia.

History 

Eastern Shewa first appears in the historical record as a Muslim state, which G. W. B. Huntingford believed was founded in 896, and had its capital at Walalah. It is believed to have been part of the Kingdom of Aksum for over a millennium that became the site of Muslim kingdoms. This state was annexed  by the Sultanate of Ifat around 1285. Recently, three urban centers thought to be part of the Muslim kingdom of Eastern Shewa, the Sultanate of Showa, were discovered by a group of French archaeologists.

Yekuno Amlak based his uprising against the Zagwe dynasty from an enclave in Shewa. He claimed Solomonic forebears, direct descendants of the pre-Zagwe Axumite emperors, who had used Shewa as their safe haven when their survival was threatened by Gudit and other enemies. This is the reason why the region got the name "Shewa" which means 'rescue' or 'save'. This claim is supported by the Kebra Nagast, a book written under one of the descendants of Yekuno Amlak, which mentions Shewa as part of the realm of Menelik I. Aksum and its predecessor Dʿmt were mostly limited to Northern Ethiopia and Eritrea during the 1st millennium BCE. However, Shewa eventually became a part of Abyssinia upon the rise of the Amhara Solomonic dynasty.

The Amhara Shewan ruling family was founded in the late 17th century by Negasi Krestos, who consolidated his control around Yifat. Traditions recorded about his ancestry vary: one tradition, recorded in 1840, claims his mother was the daughter of Ras Faris, a follower of Emperor Susenyos I who had escaped into Menz; another tradition told by Serta Wold, a councilor of Sahle Selassie, was that Negassie was a male-line descendant of Yaqob, the youngest son of Lebna Dengel, and thus assert descent from the ancient ruling Solomonic dynasty.

Notable People 
 Menelik II

See also
List of rulers of Shewa
North Shewa Zone (Amhara)
History of Ethiopia

References

 
History of Ethiopia
Provinces of Ethiopia